Noel Callahan  is a Canadian actor who is best known for his roles as Louis Testaverde-Miller on the Nickelodeon show Romeo!

In 2006, he voiced the character of Sage in an animated film starring Tony Hawk called Tony Hawk in Boom Boom Sabotage.

Callahan attended St. Thomas Aquinas Regional Secondary School in Vancouver, Canada.

References

External links 

1989 births
Canadian male child actors
Canadian male television actors
Living people
People from White Rock, British Columbia
Male actors from British Columbia
Canadian male voice actors